Shamsabad (also Romanized as Shamsābād; also known as Shamshābād) is a village in Taqanak Rural District of the Central District of Shahrekord County, Chaharmahal and Bakhtiari province, Iran. At the 2006 census, its population was 2,456 in 641 households. The following census in 2011 counted 2,725 people in 728 households. The latest census in 2016 showed a population of 2,609 people in 792 households; it was the largest village in its rural district. The village is populated by Lurs.

References 

Shahrekord County

Populated places in Chaharmahal and Bakhtiari Province

Populated places in Shahr-e Kord County

Luri settlements in Chaharmahal and Bakhtiari Province